Reuters Digital Vision Program (RDVP) was an academic program.

History 
RDVP was funded by the Reuters Foundation and encouraged innovative applications of computing and communications in the developing world. Located at Stanford University's Center for the Study of Language and Information, the Program supported social entrepreneurs and organizations who sought to leverage technology-based solutions in the interest of humanitarian, educational, and sustainable development goals. The Program fostered interdisciplinary projects and prototyping efforts that address real needs in underserved communities.

The core of the Program was a nine-month Fellowship course that brought together 12-15 experienced technologists and social entrepreneurs from around the globe. Candidates from a wide range of corporate, educational, government, and non-profit positions applied to the Program, located on the Stanford campus in the heart of Silicon Valley.

Accepted Fellows spent a sabbatical year in residence at Stanford, where they collaborated with faculty, students, commercial technologists, and — most importantly — each other as they work on their projects. Upon completion of the course, Fellows were awarded a certificate from Stanford.

Each week during the academic year the Reuters Digital Vision Program invited technology leaders and innovators from the academic, corporate, government, and non-profit sectors to visit the Program and host a seminar with the DV Fellows.

Ending 
The program ended in 2007.

The last known official post of RDVP was a blogpost on June 19, 2007. The last known fellows' blog post wasn't until January 17, 2010.

Alumni and staff
 Steven Vosloo
 Vipul Arora
Jason Banico
Ken Banks
 Dipak Basu
 Sanjay Bhargava
 Scott Bossinger
 Renee Chin
 Karen Coppock
 Laura Cuozzo
 Atanu Dey
 Rupert Douglas-Bate
 Melanie Edwards
Rajendra Nimje
Heather Ford
 Mitra Fatolapour 
 Saori Fotenos
 Nic Fulton
 Stuart Gannes 
Thomas George
 Aman Grewal
 Steve Ketchpel
 Arnon Kohavi
Brij Kothari
 Carlos Miranda Levy
 Atif Mumtaz
 Segeni Ng'ethe
 Ken Novak
 Mans Olof-Ors
 Sam Perry
 Robert Maranga
 Daniella Pontes
 Margarita Quihuis
 Pingale Rajeswari
 Netika Raval
 Mark Stevenson
 Erik Sundelof
V. K. Samaranayake
Megan Smith
 Helen Wang
 Ed Yoon
 Mercy Wambui

References

External links
Reuters Digital Vision Program at Stanford University
TechNation
Democracy Now

Stanford University
Reuters
Social entrepreneurship